Nguyễn Tiến Duy (born 29 April 1991) is a Vietnamese footballer who plays as a defender for V.League 1 club Topeland Bình Định and the Vietnam national football team.

References 

1991 births
Living people
Vietnamese footballers
Association football defenders
V.League 1 players
Than Quang Ninh FC players
Saigon FC players
Binh Dinh FC players
Vietnam international footballers
People from Quảng Ninh province